Daniil Romanovich Luntz (1912  1977) was a KGB agent who ran the Serbski Institute for Forensic Psychiatry in Moscow.

References

KGB officers
1912 births
1977 deaths